{{DISPLAYTITLE:C4H5N}}
The molecular formula C4H5N (molar mass: 67.09 g/mol, exact mass: 67.04220 u) may refer to:

 Allyl cyanide
 Methacrylonitrile (MeAN)
 Pyrrole
 Cyclopropyl cyanide

Molecular formulas